Fort Churchill Generating Station is a 226 megawatt plant located at Wabuska, Nevada owned by NV Energy.  The plant consists of 2 units and first went into service in 1968.  The plant burns natural gas to power two boilers. It is located in Lyon County, north of Yerington.

The plant cooling water is used to help sustain the Nevada Department of Wildlife’s Mason  Valley  Wildlife Management Area wetlands.

Units
1 113 MW gas-fired (1968), Babcock & Wilcox boiler with General Electric generator
1 113 MW gas-fired (1971), Babcock & Wilcox boiler with General Electric generator

Safety record
In 2010, the plant was recognized by the Edison Electric Institute for operating over 23 years without a lost time accident. The plant employs 26 people.  the plant has operated for 28 years without incurring a lost time accident.

Notes 

Energy infrastructure completed in 1968
Energy infrastructure completed in 1971
Buildings and structures in Lyon County, Nevada
Natural gas-fired power stations in Nevada